Faisal bin Sattam Al Saud (born 1970) is a Saudi Arabian businessman, lawyer, and diplomat who is the ambassador of Saudi Arabia to Italy since May 2017. He is a member of the House of Saud.

Early life and education

Prince Faisal was born in Ta'if in 1970. He is the fourth child of Sattam bin Abdulaziz. His brother, Abdulaziz bin Sattam, is an advisor at the Royal Court.

Prince Faisal completed his early education in Riyadh. He is a graduate of King Saud University, Riyadh, where he obtained a bachelor's degree in law in 1991. He received a masters of law degree from Harvard Law School in Cambridge, Massachusetts, U.S.A., in 1995.

Career
Following his return to Saudi Arabia Prince Faisal worked at private law firms in Riyadh until 2001. Next he worked at World Trade Organization in Geneva for one year. From 2002 he started his business activities. He is the owner of Jeem Holding which is based in Riyadh and deals with different sectors, including transportation, sustainability and sustainable technologies, food and beverage and real estate.

Prince Faisal was named as ambassador to Italy at the rank of minister in May 2017, replacing Rayed Khalid Krimly in the post. He was accredited as ambassador of the Kingdom of Saudi Arabia in Italy, Malta and San Marino on 21 June 2018. He is ambassador extraordinary and plenipotentiary.

Personal life
Prince Faisal is son-in-law of Mohammed bin Nawwaf Al Saud and has four children. He has a good command of English.

References

Faisal
21st-century diplomats
Faisal
1970 births
Faisal
Harvard Law School alumni
Faisal
Living people
Faisal
Faisal